Saus, Camallera i Llampaies is a municipality in the comarca of Alt Empordà, province of Girona, Catalonia, Spain. Camallera is the largest village, as well as the capital of the municipal area. The municipality's name came from the village of Saus, which was formally the most important village in its area.

References

External links
 Government data pages 

 
Populated places in Alt Empordà